The US–China Education Trust (USCET) is a non-profit organization based in Washington D.C. Founded in 1998 by Ambassador Julia Chang Bloch, the first Chinese-American U.S. Ambassador, USCET seeks to promote China–United States relations through a series of education and exchange programs. The organization sponsors a variety of fellowships, conferences, workshops and exchanges, focused primarily on strengthening Chinese academic institutions related to the fields of American Studies, Media and Journalism, American Governance, and International Relations.

The organization's expressed mission is "to promote US–China relations through education and exchange for next-generation leaders."

Programs 
USCET's activities currently fall within eight main program areas:

The American Studies Network 
Conceived to strengthen American Studies programs in China, this consortium of academic institutions, now numbering more than 50, provides opportunities for members to collaborate, share resources, and develop their capacity to teach about American society and culture. One of the primary goals of the ASN is to promote a more comprehensive understanding of the United States in China by sponsoring academic research in fields that go beyond politics and US–China relations, which tend to dominate Chinese research about America. As such, the ASN encourages scholarly collaboration and research on topics such as American culture and religion. ASN activities include an annual conference for all member universities; an American Studies Fellows program which places young Chinese scholars at American universities for a mentored semester-long fellowship; and delegations of American Studies scholars from China to the annual meeting of the American Studies Association in the United States.

Media Education Consortium 
Similar to the ASN, the Media Education Consortium (MEC) is a network of schools of journalism and communication at over 30  Chinese universities. Through annual conferences and short-term workshops, USCET seeks to use the MEC to expand the capacity of Chinese universities to train professionally skilled journalists and broadcasters. MEC programs work to build practical investigative and reporting skills for Chinese journalism students, and to strengthen the role of professionalism and media ethics within Chinese media and communication curricula.

American Governance 
USCET's earliest initiative in China, the Congressional Practicum, has expanded to include elections seminars, training sessions, and annual lectures that build knowledge among Chinese professionals, officials, and students about the workings of the US legislative and political process. Past programs have included case studies, hands-on training, and interactive exchanges among US and Chinese experts.

USCET Student Leaders Exchange 
This program was the first in the United States to be launched under President Barack Obama's "100,000 Strong" Initiative to increase the number of American students studying in China. The program provides grants to American universities to encourage students to study abroad in China.  Universities will use the funds to award travel grants to students enrolled in summer, semester, and academic year study abroad programs. Current partner universities include Boston University, San Francisco State University, the University of Arkansas, and the University of North Alabama.

Summer Institutes 
Summer Institutes are short term academic sessions for Asian students and scholars in the United States. The 2010 Summer Institute, entitled "U.S. Foreign Policy for East Asian Student Leaders," brought 20 undergraduate students from China, Korea, and Japan to Washington, DC for a four-week academic program about American politics and society. The 2010 Institute combined classroom discussions, guest lectures, field trips, and a study tour.

Greenberg/Starr Scholarships 
Named in honor of American businessman and philanthropist Maurice Greenberg, this program supports the studies of 10 Chinese students from low-income families each year, covering the cost of their full tuition at Yunnan University.

USCET-TFAS Fellowships 
USCET sponsors the participation of several Chinese university students at summer institutes organized each year by The Fund for American Studies (TFAS) at Georgetown University. Summer institutes cover a variety of topics including political journalism, philanthropy and voluntary service, business and government affairs, and comparative political and economic systems.

Law programs 
USCET is the programs arm of the FY Chang Foundation, a fund endowed by Ambassador Julia Chang Bloch and her husband Stuart Marshall Bloch at Harvard Law School in 1988.   The foundation was established in memory of Bloch's father, Chang Fuyun, the first Chinese national to graduate from Harvard Law School, and offers scholarships to Chinese students to study at Harvard Law.  In addition, the fund sponsors an annual FY Chang Lecture, which brings together eminent legal scholars and jurists from China, the US, Hong Kong and Taiwan to speak at the Peking University Law School. The 2010 FY Chang Lecture was given by former US Trade Representative Charlene Barshefsky.

History 
Ambassador Bloch first laid initial groundwork for the US–China Education Trust while serving as a visiting professor at the Institute for International Relations at Peking University during the 1998–1999 academic year. That year she lectured on American politics and US–China relations at the university and organized an international conference on the Asian financial crisis. She established a survey course at the university in American Civilization, a class which remains very popular on the campus today.

In 2001, USCET launched its first official project, a Congressional Studies program held at Fudan University's Center for American Studies. The organization formed a longstanding partnership with The Fund for American Studies (TFAS) in 2001, launching its first American Studies Summer Institute for Chinese undergraduate and graduate students at Georgetown University.

In 2004, the organization pioneered the foundation of the American Studies Network (ASN), a network of Chinese universities with American studies programs which currently includes more than 50 members. USCET's inaugural Financial Media Institute opened at Fudan University's School of Journalism in 2006. Directed by Terry Smith of PBS and Al Kamen of The Washington Post, the program brought together 22 journalism students from across China to complete an intensive certificate program. 2006 also saw USCET cooperating with the U.S. Department of Labor in delivering its first legislative training program with the People's Congresses of Shanghai and Chongqing on Mine Safety. The program, designed to help China develop and implement laws to prevent mine accidents and deaths, addressed a high priority area of Chinese policymaking. Subsequent  FMI's have been held alternately at Fudan University and Hong Kong Baptist University. 

The success of the Financial Media Institute led USCET to expand its activities within media education. In 2008 the organization successfully co-sponsored a Symposium on Global Journalism Education Reform with UNESCO at Tsinghua University.  This predated the formal launch of the Media Education Consortium in 2009. In its two years of operation the MEC has become a vehicle to expose Chinese media educators to Western journalism philosophy and practices and improve the quality of training to China's next-generation broadcasters and journalists. MEC activities now include an annual conference, short-term academic workshops for Chinese graduate students, and a Journalist-In-Residence Program.

In 2010, USCET became the first organization to launch a program under President Barack Obama's  100,000 Strong Initiative  to increase American academic exchange with China. The program, called the USCET Student Leader Exchange Program, will offer competitive travel grants to sponsor universities who demonstrate considerable effort to expand the number of undergraduates they send to study abroad in China. USCET first unveiled the program in a joint announcement at USCET's 7th American Studies Network (ASN) conference with Carola McGiffert, US State Department Senior Advisor to the Assistant Secretary of State for East Asia and the Pacific.

Additional activities 
Resources: USCET's website includes a comprehensive database of online resources related to American Studies, US–China relations, and academic exchange institutions between the US and China.  A 2010 article by Terry Lautz in The Chronicle of Higher Education applauded this database as a good model for expanding American academic presence in China.

Awards programs: In 2010 USCET held the first annual Congressional Visionary Award, presented to honor "courage, foresight, and pioneering leadership in advancing US–China relations." The first annual awards luncheon honored Senator Dianne Feinstein who, as the mayor of San Francisco, launched the first ever "sister cities" relationship between an American city and a Chinese city, with the city of Shanghai. At the organization's 20th anniversary gala in 2009, it honored former Treasury Secretary Hank Paulson with an Executive Leadership Award.

Funding 
USCET's funding base includes a variety of private foundations, government agencies, and corporate sponsors. 
Past donors include:
 The United States Department of State
 The Henry Luce Foundation
 The Starr Foundation
 The Ford Foundation
 Van Eck Global
 Mohave Development
 Nationwide Insurance
 American Resort Development Association
 Continental Airlines
 Fidelity Investments
 Prudential
 Raytheon International
 Shelby Cullom Davis Foundation
 ULLICO Inc.
 UnitedHealth Group

Founder 
USCET was founded in 1998 by Julia Chang Bloch, the first Asian American to ever achieve the rank of ambassador. Bloch served as ambassador to Nepal from 1989 to 1993. Bloch's father, Chang Fuyun, was the first Chinese graduate of Harvard Law School. Bloch was born in Shandong, China and immigrated to San Francisco at age 9 with her parents in 1951. She holds a bachelor's degree in Communications and Public Policy from the University of California, Berkeley  and a master's degree in Government and East Asia Regional Studies from Harvard University. Prior to founding USCET, Bloch spent 25 years in government service, holding various positions at the United States Agency for International Development, the US Information Agency, and the US Senate. She also spent five years in the private sector, serving various positions for Bank of America. She is married to retired lawyer and real estate specialist Stuart Marshall Bloch.

Advisory council members 
 Nicholas Platt, chair, ambassador emeritus to Pakistan, the Philippines, and Zambia, and president emeritus of the Asia Society
 Marlene Johnson, executive director and chief executive officer of NAFSA: Association of International Educators
 Robert A. Kapp, president of Robert A. Kapp & Associates, Inc., former president of US–China Business Council
 David M. Lampton, director of China Studies and Dean of Faculty at the Paul H. Nitze School of Advanced International Studies at Johns Hopkins University
 James L. McGregor, founder, chairman and CEO of JL McGregor & Company
 Peter McPherson, president of the National Association of State Universities and Land-Grant Colleges
 Tom Pickering, vice chairman at Hills & Company Consulting
 Ko-Yung Tung, senior counselor at Morrison & Foerster
 Tien Chang An, executive vice president of Burson-Marsteller China
 Harry Harding, Faculty Senior Fellow in the Miller Center of Public Affairs at the University of Virginia
 Robert Sutter, Professor of Practice of International Affairs at the George Washington University

Special Advisors
 King-Kok Cheung, literary critic and Professor at UCLA
 Madelyn Ross, former associate director of China Studies and executive director of SAIS China
 Curtis Sandberg, Founder and Principal Consultant at Apablasa Consulting: Strategic International Engagement Through Culture
 Teresita Schaffer, Senior Advisor on India and South Asia at McClarty Associates and former U.S. Ambassador to Sri Lanka

Notable participants
Over the years, a variety of notable scholars, politicians, journalists, and other leaders have participated in USCET programs, including the following:

References

External links
  US–China Education Trust Organization Website

1998 establishments in the United States
American journalism organizations
China–United States relations
Educational organizations based in the United States
Higher education
International friendship associations
Legal education
Organizations based in Washington, D.C.
Organizations established in 1998
Student exchange
Study abroad programs